Dr. Frank Arthur Forward (1902–1972) was a Canadian metallurgist and inventor. In 1947, he discovered a method for the extraction of nickel and cobalt.

The "Forward Process" was first used in Canada by the Sherritt Gordon Mines Limited. The Forward Process employs an ammonia pressure leach to separate the metals from the ore.

In the case of Sherritt, the copper and nickel were concentrated separately at the mine (these concentrates are graded about 29% copper and 12% nickel). Afterwards, the metal is leached from the concentrates by a mixture of ammonia-air. Both the nickel and the copper, together with a small quantity of cobalt, are dissolved and subsequently recovered and separated. The sulphur is converted to ammonium sulphate, which is recovered as a byproduct and used in the industry of fertilizer. - MiningBasics.com (Hydrometallurgy)

Forward was also co-inventor of the uranium extraction process used at Beaverlodge, Saskatchewan, and held about 50 patents on similar metallurgical processes.  He is the author of numerous technical and scientific papers, including an article in the Encyclopædia Britannica on "hydrometallurgy," a subject on which he was regarded to be the world’s leading authority. In addition to holding membership and executive posts in professional and government organizations, Professor Forward received almost every major award in the field of extractive metallurgy. These include the Inca Medal, the Leonard Medal of the Engineering Institute of Canada, and the Gold Medal of the Institute of Mining and Metallurgy, London. In 1960, Forward became director of the Canadian Uranium Research Foundation, an organization formed to find new uses and markets for uranium.

Notes

External links
 Mining basics
 National Resources Canada
 University of Toronto alumni notes
 Reference to the "late Professor Frank Forward"

Canadian metallurgists
20th-century Canadian inventors
1902 births
1972 deaths
Fellows of the Minerals, Metals & Materials Society